= Kroger 200 =

Kroger 200 can mean:

- The Xfinity Series race at Indianapolis Raceway Park, held from 1982 through 2012.
- The fall Truck Series race at Martinsville, held since 2004, and which was titled the Kroger 200 from 2004 to 2015.
- The Clean Harbors 250, a NASCAR Craftsman Truck Series race held at Richmond International Raceway from 1995 through 2005, and which was titled the Kroger 200 in 2000, 2001 and 2004.
